Hengchun earthquake may refer to:

1959 Hengchun earthquake
2006 Hengchun earthquakes